John Anthony Madden ( 1896 – 1954) was an Irish politician and medical practitioner. He was first elected to Dáil Éireann as a Sinn Féin Teachta Dála (TD) for the Mayo North constituency at the November 1924 by-election caused by the disqualification of Cumann na nGaedheal's Henry Coyle, who was imprisoned for bouncing cheques.

Madden was re-elected at the June 1927 general election but did not take his seat in either Dáil due to Sinn Féin's abstentionist policy. He did not contest the September 1927 general election.

References

1890s births
1954 deaths
Members of the 4th Dáil
Members of the 5th Dáil
Politicians from County Mayo
Early Sinn Féin TDs